TVNZ 1 is the first national television channel owned and operated by the state-owned broadcaster Television New Zealand (TVNZ). It is the oldest television broadcaster in New Zealand, starting out from 1960 as independent channels in the four main centres of Auckland, Wellington, Christchurch and Dunedin, networking in 1969 to become NZBC TV (although the individual facilities retained their call signs into the 1970s). The network was renamed Television One (TV ONE, stylized as oɴe) in 1975 upon the break-up of the New Zealand Broadcasting Corporation, and became a part of TVNZ in 1980 when Television One and South Pacific Television (now sister channel TVNZ 2) merged. The channel assumed its current name in October 2016.

TVNZ 1 is both a public broadcaster and a commercial broadcaster. Central to TVNZ 1 is news and current affairs, which is produced under the banner 1 News. Also, it broadcasts sports programming under the banner 1 Sport. Other programming targets the 25 to 54 demographic, and consists of mainly drama, general entertainment and documentaries, both locally and internationally (especially British) produced.

History

1960–1975: NZBC TV
At 7:30pm on 1 June 1960, New Zealand's first television channel, AKTV2, started broadcasting in Auckland from the NZBC building at 74 Shortland Street, previously used to broadcast public radio station 1YA and now home to The University of Auckland's Gus Fisher Gallery. Owned and operated by the New Zealand Broadcasting Service (NZBS, which became the New Zealand Broadcasting Corporation in 1962), it initially broadcast for two hours a day, two days a week. Christchurch's CHTV3 followed in June 1961, Wellington's WNTV1 a month later, and Dunedin's DNTV2 on 31 July 1962.

Television licences were introduced in August 1960, initially costing NZ£4 (equal to NZ$171 in December 2013). Television advertisements began in April 1961 and were initially allowed only on Tuesdays, Thursdays and Saturdays.

Relay stations gradually expanded the four channels into regional New Zealand. Television coverage was expanded to Waikato, Tauranga, Manawatu and Wairarapa in 1963, to Hawke's Bay, South Otago and Southland in 1964, to South Canterbury in 1965 and to Whangarei and Taranaki in 1966. In addition, a number of televiewers' societies were established to set up and operate their own translators. By 1965, 300,000 television licences had been issued, and television was broadcasting seven nights a week.

Initially, the four television facilities were unlinked, and programming had to be shipped between stations. Footage shot in Wellington could not be broadcast in other centres around the country in real-time, and the extra-tropical cyclone which contributed to the disaster grounded air traffic, preventing the film being flown to other centres. Footage was screened in Christchurch and Dunedin via a recording made from the Wellington signal received in Kaikoura, which was then driven to Christchurch to be aired immediately.

By the time of the Apollo 11 mission in July 1969, the two islands were each network-capable via microwave link, but the link over Cook Strait had not been completed, and there was no link between New Zealand and the outside world. Footage of the moon landing was recorded on video tape at the Australian Broadcasting Commission's ABN-2 in Sydney, then rushed by an RNZAF English Electric Canberra to Wellington and WNTV1. To forward this to the South Island, the NZBC positioned one of its first outside broadcasting vans to beam the footage to a receiving dish across Cook Strait, from which it was forwarded through the recently commissioned South Island network. The link was completed later that year, the first NZBC Network News transmitted on 3 November, read by newsreader Dougal Stevenson.

With the establishment of the Warkworth satellite station in 1971, New Zealand could finally communicate with the rest of the world. The first live broadcast received by satellite was the 1971 Melbourne Cup on 2 November.

For the first 13 years, NZBC TV broadcast solely in black and white. Colour television, using the Phase alternating line (PAL) system, was introduced on 31 October 1973, in preparation for the 1974 British Commonwealth Games, held in Christchurch the following February. Due to the lack of colour facilities, only four of the ten sports (swimming, diving, athletics and boxing) could be broadcast in colour.

1975–1980: Television One

On 1 April 1975, the NZBC was split into 3 separate state owned corporations: Television One, TV2 and Radio New Zealand.

The existing NZBC television service became Television One, and was based in Avalon Television Centre in Lower Hutt which opened that day. Television One used the WNTV1 and DNTV2 studios and the existing channel frequencies, while AKTV2's Shortland Street studios and CHTV3 studios and new channel frequencies were used for the new TV2, which commenced later that year.

Television One commenced transmission on Tuesday 1 April 1975 at 2pm with a five-minute news bulletin read by Bill McCarthy, followed by the British drama series Harriet's Back in Town. Its two-hour opening special was broadcast live to air at 7pm that night and featured a preview of the programmes, plans and personalities for the new service.

On Saturday 17 July 1976, after snow and gale-force winds cut mains power to the Blue Duck microwave station near Kaikoura, the station's diesel generator failed and left it running on batteries. The batteries eventually discharged by 7pm that night, severing the Television One network feed south into Canterbury, Otago and Southland. Technicians couldn't reach the station to repair the diesel generator and restore the network until late on Sunday morning, meaning most of the South Island missed the live opening ceremony of the 1976 Summer Olympics.

1980–present: TVNZ 

In 1980 the two television channels merged to form Television New Zealand, with the purpose of finally providing a dividend to the Government. The merger was promised to provide 'complementary programming' for both channels. The channel was renamed as "Television One" until early 1995, when it was announced on-air as just "TV One".

Regional news programming was reintroduced in 1980 screening at 7.30pm for half an hour. The regional programmes broadcast from the four main TVNZ studios in Auckland (Top Half), Wellington (Today Tonight), Christchurch (The Mainland Touch) and Dunedin (7.30 South).

In 1982, the regional programmes were incorporated into the network news bulletin with 7.30 South rebranded as The South Tonight. Each region would break out from the network news for a 20-minute regional programme before returning to the network news for the weather. In 1989 the regional programmes were transferred to Network Two in the new timeslot of 5.45pm, and Top Half and Today Tonight were axed later that year. In 1990 The Mainland Touch and The South Tonight were transferred back to Television One and screened immediately after the Māori news programme Te Karere (live at 5.20pm in the North Island, delayed at 5.35pm in the South Island) and before the network news. Both programmes were axed altogether at the end of 1990.

In August 2008, TV One, along with TV2, moved to 720p high-definition for the start of the 2008 Summer Olympics in Beijing. Both channels were originally only available in high-definition on the Freeview HD platform, before commencing high-definition broadcasts on the Sky platform on 1 June 2009 now moved to 1080i in August 2010.

In October 2016, the channel was renamed TVNZ 1.

Branding
TV One has used numerous logos throughout its history. Until 2016, all displayed "one" as a word, rather than as a number. The original 1975 logo featured large rounded lettering, sometimes with the top half of the "o" in the lowercase "one" divided into rainbow colours. This was replaced after the formation of Television New Zealand in 1980, with uppercase inline lettering.

The Friz Quadrata typeface and a more classical look debuted in 1987, contrasting Channel 2's more contemporary appearance. The more familiar sans serif italic lettering, with mixed case lettering, was launched during the 1996 Olympics, variations of this logo were used up to 2013 with the colours changing every few years or the logo behind a coloured background. In 2013 the logo was changed, continuing to use the sans serif lettering but no longer in italics.

In October 2016, TV One was rebranded as TVNZ 1 with the logo changed to simply the number 1 in bold black with a red scribble pattern around the number, while sister channel TV2 renamed TVNZ 2, with a purple scribble pattern around the number.

Programming
Long-running TVNZ 1 programmes include rural documentary show Country Calendar (since 1966) and consumer affairs show Fair Go (since 1977). The twice-weekly Lotto draw airs on TVNZ 1 at 8:00pm on Saturdays and 8:20pm on Wednesdays.

News operation 
TVNZ 1 broadcasts approximately 35 hours of news bulletins and current affairs programming per week. The flagship news bulletin is the daily hour-long 1 News at 6pm. Half-hour bulletins air on weekdays at midday (1 News at Midday) and 10:30pm (1 News Tonight). Breakfast airs from 6:00am to 9:00am on weekdays with five-minute bulletins every half-hour. The Māori language bulletin Te Karere airs at 4:00pm on weekdays. 

Seven Sharp is a weekday half-hour current affairs show following the 6pm bulletin. Hour-long long-form journalism shows include 20/20 on Monday evenings and Sunday on Sunday evenings. The hour-long political affairs show Q+A airs on Sunday mornings.

Technical details 
From launch in 1960 until digital television transition was completed on 1 December 2013, TVNZ 1 broadcast terrestrially using analogue PAL-B&G. 

The channel is broadcast on the government owned Kordia terrestrial network as well as on one of the two Kordia satellite transponders, which is included in channel packages on the Freeview, Igloo (2012–2017), and Sky platforms.

TVNZ 1+1

TVNZ 1+1 was launched to Freeview and Sky customers from 1 July 2012 as TV ONE Plus 1. It is a channel with a one-hour time shift of the TVNZ 1 Auckland feed. The channel is available on Channel 6 on Freeview and 501 on Sky. This channel replaced TVNZ 7, which was a public service news and documentary channel. On 1 September 2013, when TV2+1 (now called TVNZ 2+1) launched to replace TVNZ U, TV ONE Plus 1 moved to Channel 6 on Freeview, while TV2+1 took over Channel 7. The channel was rebranded as TVNZ 1+1 on 1 October 2016. On 21 March 2022, TVNZ 1+1 moved from Freeview channel 6 to Freeview channel 11 as part of six Freeview channel changes.

References

External links

TVNZ
Television channels in New Zealand
Television channels and stations established in 1960
English-language television stations in New Zealand